The Fifth Lee Kuan Yew Cabinet is the fifth Cabinet of Singapore formed by Prime Minister Lee Kuan Yew. It was formed in 1976 after the 1976 Singaporean general election.

Ministers

Ministers of State and Parliamentary Secretaries

References 

Executive branch of the government of Singapore
Lists of political office-holders in Singapore
Cabinets established in 1976
Lee Kuan Yew